The Sisters of Saint Francis of Rochester, Minnesota is a Roman Catholic religious congregation for women. The congregation was founded in 1877 by Mother Mary Alfred Moes in the Diocese of St. Paul of Minnesota. The motherhouse, which is in Rochester, Minnesota, is called Assisi Heights.

History

In 1876, Sister Mary Alfred Moes, along with her birth sister, Sister Barbara (Catherine) Moes, and 23 other Franciscan Sisters from Joliet, Illinois, came to Rochester, Minnesota, to establish Our Lady of Lourdes School. However, in 1877, a dispute over finances regarding the new academy led Chicago Bishop Thomas Foley to direct the sisters to separate from the Joliet Community.

The congregation founded Saint Marys Hospital (Rochester), which is now part of the Mayo Clinic. The grounds were purchased by the sisters, and the building was erected under the supervision of the Mother Superior. Sister-nurses tended to the sick, cooked the patients’ meals, did the laundry, stoked the furnace and even used the hair of convent horses to make surgical sutures. 

The Sisters also continued their work in education, staffing parochial schools in Minnesota and beyond, while also establishing academies in Owatonna and Rochester. Their work included post-secondary education, and in 1894, they founded what would become the College of Saint Teresa in Winona, Minnesota.

Present day
Many Sisters work in areas of social service, spiritual care and service abroad. Others continued their ministries in health care and education. The Sisters operate schools and a clinic in Bogotá, Colombia. They also run a spiritual retreat center in Janesville, Minnesota. As of 2004, there were about 300 members of the congregation.

See also
Florence Church Bullard
St. Francis, Minnesota
Women of Mayo Clinic

Notes

References
 Kraman, OSF, Carlan. Odyssey in Faith: The Story of Mother Alfred Moes. Rochester, MN: Sisters of St. Francis, 1990.

External links 
Sisters of Saint Francis of Rochester, Minnesota

Catholic female orders and societies
Congregations of Franciscan sisters
Christianity in Minnesota
Roman Catholic Ecclesiastical Province of Saint Paul and Minneapolis
Buildings and structures in Rochester, Minnesota
Religious organizations established in 1877
Catholic organizations established in the 19th century
Catholic religious orders established in the 19th century
1877 establishments in Minnesota
Mayo Clinic people
Women in Minnesota